John Ambrose Cope, Baron Cope of Berkeley, PC (born 13 May 1937) is a Conservative Party politician in the United Kingdom.

Education
Cope was educated at Oakham School before qualifying as a Chartered Accountant.

Career
Cope contested Woolwich East in the 1970 General Election, but was defeated by Labour's Christopher Mayhew. Thereafter he served as Member of Parliament for South Gloucestershire from 1974 to 1983. When that constituency was abolished for the 1983 general election, he was returned for the new Northavon constituency, serving until his defeat in the 1997 general election by the Liberal Democrat Steve Webb. Within the Conservative Party, he was an Assistant Whip from June 1979 to June 1981.

His first political office was as a Lord Commissioner of the Treasury (June 1981 to June 1983), and then he was Treasurer of HM Household (1983-1987), and was then appointed Minister of State for Employment (with a special focus on small businesses) 1987–1989.  He was then Minister of State for Security and Finance at the Northern Ireland Office until November 1990.  In the meantime, in 1988, he was sworn as a member of the Privy Council.  Cope served as Paymaster-General (HM Treasury) in John Major's government between 1992 and 1994.

He was made a life peer as Baron Cope of Berkeley, of Berkeley in the County of Gloucestershire on 4 October 1997. He served as Opposition Chief Whip in the House of Lords, on the Conservative front bench, from 2001 to 2007, when he was replaced by Baroness Anelay.

In 2012 Cope made the opening speech to the House of Lords, presenting a motion for the Loyal Address on the opening day of Parliament.

He retired from the House of Lords on 13 May 2020, his 83rd birthday.

Charity work
Lord Cope is a patron of the charity Kids for Kids, helping children in rural areas of Darfur, Sudan. He is a patron of The West of England MS Therapy Centre, a charity helping those in Bristol and the surrounding areas live independent lives whilst coping with MS and other neurological conditions, Lord Cope is also President of the Friends of the Royal National Hospital for Rheumatic Diseases in Bath.

Lord Cope has also been a Trustee of War Memorials Trust since 1999; this is a conservation charity that works for the protection of war memorials across the United Kingdom.

References

|-

|-

|-

|-

|-

|-

1937 births
Cope of Berkeley
Life peers created by Elizabeth II
Conservative Party (UK) MPs for English constituencies
Living people
Members of the Privy Council of the United Kingdom
UK MPs 1974
UK MPs 1974–1979
UK MPs 1979–1983
UK MPs 1983–1987
UK MPs 1987–1992
UK MPs 1992–1997
United Kingdom Paymasters General
Treasurers of the Household
Knights Bachelor
Northern Ireland Office junior ministers